Clambus may refer to:
Clambus (beetle), a genus of insects in the family Clambidae
Clambus (plant), a genus of plants in the family Phyllanthaceae